The 2012–13 Elitedivisionen was the 41st edition of Denmark women's football premier league. It ran from August 4, 2012 to June 9, 2013.

Brøndby IF won its eighth championship, and the third one on a row, winning all games but one against Fortuna Hjørring, which also qualified for the 2013-14 UEFA Women's Champions League as the runner-up. Odense BK and IK Skovbakken also made it to the championship play-offs, while Vejle BK and BK 1913 were relegated.

Teams

First stage

Second stage
For the second stage, the points of the first stage were halved and rounded up.
Championship round

Relegation round

References

2012-13
Den
1